M. Kula Segaran s/o V. Murugeson (born 10 August 1957), commonly referred to as Kula, is a Malaysian politician and barrister who served as the Minister of Human Resources in the Pakatan Harapan (PH) administration under former prime minister Mahathir Mohamad from May 2018 to the collapse of the PH administration in February 2020. He has served as the Member of Parliament (MP) for Ipoh Barat since March 2004 and Teluk Intan from May 1997 to November 1999. He is a member and vice-chairman of the Democratic Action Party (DAP), a component party of the PH opposition coalition.

Early life and education
M. Kula Segaran was born to a rubber tapper father in an estate in Sitiawan, Perak. Growing up, he and his brother had to look after cows, goats and also clean up the containers used to gather latex after school. In 1982, he was admitted as barrister at Lincoln's Inn in London.

Political career
Kula Segaran, is an ethnic Tamil and a barrister by profession who joins the DAP, has voiced many issues affecting the Malaysian Indian community. He has claimed that "Indians are treated like third-class citizens" and also criticised the demolition of Hindu temples in the country.

Member of Parliament
He was first elected to Parliament in a 1997 by-election for the seat of Telok Intan as DAP candidate. He shifted to the seat of Ipoh Barat at the 1999 general election, but lost. He re-contested the seat in the 2004 election, and this time won by a narrow margin. He was re-elected by wider margins in subsequent 2008 election, 2013 election and 2018 election.

Parliamentarians for Global Action (PGA) 
Kula was made chairman of the Malaysian chapter of the Parliamentarians for Global Action (PGA) in 2019. He is also an executive board member of the group. In that capacity he has been advocating the need for Malaysia to ratify the Rome Statute to the International Criminal Court (ICC) and to call for the Abolishment of the Mandatory Death Penalty and the ratification of The Arms Trade Treaty (ATT).

Minister of Human Resources
After the Pakatan Harapan coalition of which the DAP is part of, emerged victorious in the 2018 general election to forming the Federal Government, new Prime Minister Mahathir Mohamad appointed Kula Segaran's as the Minister of Human Resources in May 2018. He sparked interest on social media for wearing thallapa during swearing-in ceremony as a minister.

Kula is the first Human Resources Minister to conduct the National Labour Advisory Council (NLAC), a tripartite stakeholders meeting, 10 times in a year (2019) . The government, Malaysian Employers Federation (MEF) and Malaysian Trades Union Congress (MTUC) are stakeholders in the NLAC. Kula also made international headlines for declaring War on Human Trafficking in Malaysia after acknowledging that the country had been hurting from it. The Minister held Townhall sessions with employers urging them to start being more accountable and to assist the government in eradicating Forced Labour. Kula urged employers to start incorporating Social Compliance Audit reports as part of their accountability. The Minister wants to move up from being at Tier 2 Watchlist of the US State Department's Trafficking in Persons report and is working closely with stakeholders to achieve this. He has overseen several law amendments to better protect against discrimination as well as enhancing worker's rights and social protection. Kula has also championed the rights of the Orang Asli community as provided them a pathway to learn technical skills through Institutes under the Ministry. 17 Orang Asli students were enrolled in ILP Ipoh in 2020 following the 7 enrolled in 2019 after the encouragement of the Minister. As outlines in Kula's 2019 achievements as Minister, most notably was Empowering TVET learning to prepare for future jobs and emerging technologies that are shaping the industries of the future.

Controversy
In 2007, Kula Segaran was suspended from Parliament for four days for disobeying the Deputy Speaker, and in 2008 he was called a "bastard" and a "bloody bastard" by a government politician whom he accused of being "hated" by Indian constituents.

During a visit to an event in 2018, he caused a controversy when he claimed that the Malay people are the immigrants of Malay Peninsula while the real natives were the Indians. After an uproar, he later apologized and retracted his remarks.

Less than a year later during 2019 Rantau by-election, he was criticized for his speech urging Indian voters to vote for the Pakatan Harapan candidate Dr. Streram Sinnasamy due to him being from the same community as they are. He also claimed that the Indian community would never approach non-Indian ministers to resolve their problems and admitted his preference to eat at Indian restaurants when he visited Rantau.

Election results

References

External links
 

Living people
1957 births
People from Perak
Malaysian Hindus
20th-century Malaysian lawyers
Malaysian politicians of Indian descent
Malaysian politicians of Tamil descent
Democratic Action Party (Malaysia) politicians
Members of the Dewan Rakyat
Government ministers of Malaysia
21st-century Malaysian politicians